Stephen James Bartalo (born July 15, 1964) is a former American professional football player who was a running back in the National Football League (NFL) and the World League of American Football (WLAF). He played for the Tampa Bay Buccaneers of the NFL, and the Frankfurt Galaxy of the WLAF. Bartalo played collegiately at the Colorado State University.

Bartalo was inducted to the Colorado State University Athletics Hall of Fame in 1995.

See also
 List of NCAA major college football yearly scoring leaders

References

1964 births
Living people
American football fullbacks
Colorado State Rams football players
Frankfurt Galaxy players
People from Limestone, Maine
Players of American football from Maine
Tampa Bay Buccaneers players
San Francisco 49ers players